Wagon Wheels is a 1934 Western film directed by Charles Barton and starring Randolph Scott and Gail Patrick. It is a remake of 1931's Fighting Caravans, using stock footage from the original and substituting a new cast. It was based on the Zane Grey novel Fighting Caravans. The supporting cast features Monte Blue and Raymond Hatton.

Cast
 Randolph Scott as Clint Belmet
 Gail Patrick as Nancy Wellington
 Billy Lee as Sonny Wellington
 Monte Blue as Kenneth Murdock
 Raymond Hatton as Jim Burch
 Jan Duggan as Abby Masters
 Leila Bennett as Hetty Masters
 Olin Howland as Bill O'Leary
 Howard Wilson as Permit Officer
 Julian Madison as Lester
 Alfred Delcambre as Ebe
 Donald Gray as Chauncey (as Eldred Tidbury)
 Colin Tapley as Mountaineer

External links

1934 Western (genre) films
1934 films
Films based on works by Zane Grey
American Western (genre) films
American black-and-white films
1930s English-language films
Films based on American novels
Films based on Western (genre) novels
Films directed by Charles Barton
Paramount Pictures films
1930s American films